A Wicked Woman is a 1934 drama film directed by Charles Brabin and starring Mady Christians as a woman who kills her abusive husband to protect her family and builds a new life to raise their four children. The film also stars Jean Parker and Charles Bickford. It was based on the novel Wicked Woman by Anne Austin.

Plot

Cast
 Mady Christians as Naomi Trice, aka Naomi Stroud
 Jean Parker as Rosanne
 Charles Bickford as Naylor, the man who wins Naomi's love
 Betty Furness as Yancey
 William Henry as Curtis
 Jackie Searl as Curtis as a Child (as Jackie Searle)
 Betty Jane Graham as Yancey as a Child
 Marilyn Harris as Rosanne as a Child
 Paul Harvey as Ed Trice
 Zelda Sears as Gram Teague
 Robert Taylor as Bill Renton
 Sterling Holloway as Peter
 Georgie Billings as Neddie
 DeWitt Jennings as The Sheriff

Box office
According to MGM records the film earned $206,000 in the US and Canada and $127,000 elsewhere, resulting in a loss of $181,000.

References

External links
 
 
 
 

American romantic drama films
American black-and-white films
Films based on American novels
Films directed by Charles Brabin
Metro-Goldwyn-Mayer films
Mariticide in fiction
1934 romantic drama films
Films produced by Harry Rapf
1934 films
Films with screenplays by Florence Ryerson
1930s American films